The Kasatka class was a class of submarines built for the Imperial Russian Navy. The six boats were built between 1904 and 1905. The first boat, experienced significant problems with stability on trials and had to have extra flotation added. In 1905, four of the class were transferred from Western Russia to Vladivostok with the outbreak of the Russo-Japanese War. Initially powered by a kerosene/electrical system, the boats were re-built around 1910 with a diesel-electric power plant following the end of the war. The class remained in service throughout World War I. Two were captured by the German Empire in 1918 and handed over to the British following the German surrender. They were scuttled by the British in 1919 to prevent their capture by the Soviets. The remaining four were broken up for scrap in 1922.

Design and description
The design was accepted by the Naval Technical Committee on 20 December 1903. Initially the design called for a three-shaft propulsion system, but due to the increased hostilities with the Empire of Japan, the submarines were completed with only the one shaft-design. The class was armed with four torpedoes carried externally in Drzewiecki drop collars and one machine gun. Vessels of the class had a complement of 24.

Modifications
In 1906–1907, new conning towers were installed aboard the submarines to rectify buoyancy issues. In 1910, the Kasatka class were rebuilt with new power plants. The displacement of the submarines increased to  surfaced and  submerged. Two of the class, Nalim and Skat, were given a  gun in 1915.

Ships

Service history
The first submarine of the class, Kasatka was ordered in the 1903 building programme on 2 January 1904, with the rest ordered as part of the 1904 Emergency Programme, with the next four ordered on 24 February 1904 and Feldmarshal General Sheremetev on 26 March 1904. Feldmarshal General Sheremetev was paid for by public subscription with the Sheremetev family as major donors. Due to the outbreak of the Russo-Japanese War, construction was accelerated on the submarines and only Kasatka ran sea trials. During trials, Kasatka had trouble during operation of the ballast tanks, steering gear and water entered the submarine through the main hatch when submerged. The latter problem was rectified by the addition of two floats attached to the aft casing first on Kasatka and then on the others. Kasatka was then transferred to Vladivostok by rail, followed by the rest between September and December 1904 with the exception of Makrel and Okun. Makrel and Okun remained in the west and were used as evaluation boats for the design. Kasatka and Skat became operational in March 1905, followed by Feldmarshal General Sheremetev and Nalim in May 1905. Completion of Makrel and Okun took until 1907. At Vladivostok, the submarines were used as a deterrent against Japanese warships. Upon completion Makrel and Okun were assigned to the 1st Division of the Baltic Fleet.

During World War I, Nalim and Skat were transferred to the Black Sea in 1915 and joined the Black Sea Fleet. That same year, Feldmarshal General Sheremetev and Kasatka were transferred to the Baltic Sea and joined the Baltic Fleet. In June 1915, Okun and Makrel were among the submarines deployed off the Kurland coast. Okun engaged the German cruiser , but missed. However, the submarine threat led the German command to withdraw their ships from around Windau. In August, the two submarines were ordered to the Gulf of Riga as part of the Russian attempt to defend against the German High Seas Fleet's movements in the area. Following the arrival of British submarine reinforcements, the smaller Russian submarines were deployed on coastal defence missions in the Baltic. After the entry of the Romania into the war on the side of the Allies in 1916, Nalim and Skat were based at Batumi but remained relatively inactive. Kasatka and Feldmarshal General Sheremetev transferred to Arkhangelsk in 1915 and 1916 respectively, arriving via inland waterways. In 1917, the two submarines were sent back to the Baltic for overhaul.

In March 1917, Nalim and Skat were removed from service. In August 1917, Feldmarshal General Sheremetev was renamed Keta. In 1918, Kasatka, Makrel and Okun were transferred to the Caspian Sea. In April 1918, Nalim and Skat were re-activated and used against the Soviets. After the Treaty of Brest-Litovsk was signed ending the Russian participation in World War I, they briefly flew the flag of the Ukrainian State before the Germans seized Nalim and Skat. In November 1918, following the Armistice of 11 November 1918 which ended World War I, the British took over the submarines after the German Empire surrendered. The two subs were later scuttled by the British at Sevastopol to prevent their capture by the Soviets during the Russian Civil War. The surviving boats were broken up for scrap in 1922.

Notes

Citations

References
 
 
 

Submarine classes
Submarines of the Imperial Russian Navy